Adrián Sáez de Arregi Egurrola (born 17 March 1986 in Araia) is a Spanish former professional cyclist. He participated in the 2012 Giro d'Italia.

Major results
2011
 3rd Cinturó de Empordà
 4th Tour de Gironde

References

External links

1986 births
Living people
Spanish male cyclists
Sportspeople from Álava
Cyclists from the Basque Country (autonomous community)